Worthington railway station was a station at Worthington, Leicestershire, England.

History

In 1930 passenger services was withdrawn and the Midland's successor, the London, Midland and Scottish Railway, was using the line only for freight services. During the Second World War the line became the Melbourne Military Railway. In 1945 the War Department returned the line and station to the LMS.

In 1980 British Railways closed the line and by the 1990s the track had been dismantled. National Cycle Route 6 now joins the trackbed at the site of the former station.

Stationmasters

A. Nowell until 1872 (afterwards station master at Rainworth)
John Mercer 1872 - 1874 (afterwards station master at Kirkby-in-Ashfield East)
W. Wright 1874 - 1875 
Henry Kirk 1875 - 1881 (afterwards station master at Kingsbury)
Edwin Allard 1881 - 1883 
J. Edwards 1883 - 1886 
G.F.  Munns 1886 
S. Oughton 1886 - 1887  (afterwards station master at Ribblehead)
E. Birkinshaw 1887 - 1891 (afterwards station master at Harvington)
S. Hart 1891 - 1894 (formerly station master at Tonge and Breedon)
G. Albutt 1894 - 1896 (formerly station master at Tonge and Breedon)
Thomas Beighton 1896 - 1901 (afterwards station master at Thornton)
J. Gaffertty 1901 - 1904 (afterwards station master at Denby)
W.J. Lloyd 1904 - 1907 
G.H. Aewey 1907 - 1908
Harry York 1908 - ca. 1911
Arthur John Tilley ca. 1914 ca. 1925
T.F. Houle 1932 - 1939 (afterwards station master at Hasland)
A. Robinson from 1939 (formerly station master at Melbourne)

Route

References

Disused railway stations in Leicestershire
Former Midland Railway stations
Railway stations in Great Britain opened in 1869
Railway stations in Great Britain closed in 1930